Villamontes (or: Villa Montes) is a town in the Tarija Department in south-eastern Bolivia. Also it is called the benemerita town (well-deserving of the mother country) due to its importance during the Chaco War in the 1930s.

Location

Villamontes is the administrative center of Villamontes Municipio and situated at 388 m above sea level, on the left bank of Río Pilcomayo where the river crosses the Sierra del Aguarague mountain range and flows southeast into the Chaco-Foreland.

Geography

Villamontes is located in the subhumid tropical zone, with a distinct dry season from June to September.

West of the town in a north-southerly direction ranges the sub Andean Sierra del Aguarague, with a summit of 1,390 m 7 km west of Villamontes.

The town is crossed by Río Caiguami which discharges into Río Pilcomayo on the southern outskirts of Villamontes.

Villamontes has recorded the hottest temperature ever in Bolivia, several times, most recently on 29 October 2010.

History
During the Chaco War between Bolivia and Paraguay (1932–1935) Villamontes accommodated the headquarters of the Bolivian Army. During the final stage of the war, the main lines of defense commanded by General Bernardino Bilbao Rioja were situated here.

Villamontes became famous by the so-called "Corralito de Villamontes" (1934), when the head of state, Dr. Daniel Salamanca Urey, was arrested by army units during his stay at Villamontes, and on 28 November 1934 was substituted in a coup d'état by vice president José Luis Tejada Sorzano.

Population
Villamontes had a population of 11,086 inhabitants in 1992 (census), 16,214 inhabitants in 2001 (census), and has more than 20,000 inhabitants by 2007. In the official data of the census 2012, the municipality of Villa Montes has 39,800 inhabitants which is an increase more than 100% compared to the 2001 census.
Reason for the explosive increase has been the deployment of oil and gas fields in this region since the early 1990s.

References

External links 
 Map of Province
 Climate Villamontes

Populated places in Tarija Department